Khaf County (Šahrestâne Xvâf) is in Razavi Khorasan province, Iran. The capital of the county is the city of Khaf. At the 2006 census, the county's population was 108,964 in 23,896 households. The following census in 2011 counted 121,859 people in 29,923 households. At the 2016 census, the county's population was 138,972 in 36,399 households.

The historical city of Zozan is located close to Khaf and has been submitted to World Heritage tentative lists by UNESCO.

Administrative divisions

The population history of Khaf County's administrative divisions over three consecutive censuses is shown in the following table. The latest census shows four districts, eight rural districts, and five cities.

References

 

Counties of Razavi Khorasan Province